The capital city of Kosovo, Pristina, especially National Theater-Pristina is the host of many different film festivals. Celebrities from all over the world walk in the red carpet of the festivals which are held annually. These festivals make the city attracts interest from local and international visitors, therefore making the city's life more dynamic. The list below shows the main film festivals held in Pristina.

Prishtina International Film Festival 

Prishtina International Film Festival (PriFilmFest) is an annual festival seven-day festival. It began in 2009 as a mark after the declaration of independence. It’s held on National Theater-Pristina in September, but the sixth edition is being held from 25 April to 2 May 2014.  As part of the event, the winners receive a statue called "Golden Goddess", which is based from a figure "Goddess on the Throne" that was discovered in Kosovo in 1960 and had become city’s symbol. From 2010 PriFilmFest launched PriFilm Forum which consists seminars, workshops and discussions between Kosovo film-makers and those from neighbouring countries.

The PriFilmFest founders are: Vjosa Berisha, Fatos Berisha, Orhan Kerkezi and Faton Hasimja.

Hyjnesha ne Fron

Fest Film Kosovo “Hyjnesha ne Fron” is an annual festival which was founded in year 2002. It’s held between September and December. In the first five editions the festival has been held in different cities of Kosovo. Now traditionally it is held in on capital city of Kosovo, Pristina. The name of the festival comes from 5000-year-old monument found in Kosovo and it became Prishtina City's symbol.

The festival program includes feature length fictions films and short films. The competition is divided in:

 International Competition – for feature films from all over the world (over 60 minutes)
 Shorts Competition – for short films from all over the world(40 minutes or less)
 Shorts Competition – for short films national competition (40 minutes or less)
 Special Screening - new films by established film-makers

Awards :

 The leading actor
 The leading actress
 Supporting role actor 
 Supporting role actress
 Best Screenplay Award 
 Best Photography Award
 Best Director Award
 Best Film Award
 Best International Award
 Cinema of the future
 Reward for life work

Skena Up

"Skena Up Festival" is an annual seven-day special international festival for students of film and theater. It began in year 2003 and it’s held between October and December in National Theater-Pristina. It was founded by a group of students and new artists from University of Prishtina. Is formed as a competition for upcoming artists that makes this festival unique. 
The festival has two goals. First providing suitable forum for students to present their work to the public therefore creating interaction with audience and also receiving feedback. Secondly, by bringing together peers from all over the world and introducing students to internationally renowned directors, producers, writers and actors.
As a part of the festivals are workshops, AfterParties and volunteers.

Skena UP is part of The International Young Makers in Transit which aims to create opportunities for young European theater makers to show their work on platforms all over Europe. While participating, the young artists engage with European colleagues and will build an international network.

Awards :

Film Competition

Best fiction film 
Best documentary film 
Best animation film 
Best National film
Best "ExYU generation Next"
Special Jury Mention 

Theater Competition

 Best Theater Performance 
 Best Directing
 Best actor
 ADRIANA award
 Special Jury Mention

Nine Eleven

"Nine Eleven" is an annual five-day festival dedicated in remembrance of the live lost in the terrorist attack on the World Trade Center in 2001. It began In 2003 as a film, sculpture and modern design competition expressing artists points of view on that particular day in 2001. From the second edition it has only short film competition.
It’s held in September on National Theater-Pristina only dedicated only to Albanian film-makers. It was founded from Blerim Gjoci.

Awards :
 Best Film 
 Best Cinematography
 Best Editing
 Best Directing
 Best Screenplay
 Best actress
 Best actor
 Best music

Rolling Film Festival 

"Rolling Film Festival" is four-day international film festival dedicated to Roma Community. It began in 2009 and now is in its fourth edition. In its third edition the festival took place in 5 different screening places throughout the city of Pristina. Films are selected to demonstrate the diversity, richness, and common humanity of Roma stories, therefore goal of the festival is showing the "dreams" and culture of Roma community. The part of the festival are discussion session between movies, workshops, volunteers and music concerts.

Nje Bote Film Festival

"Nje Bote" Film Festival is an annual International Documentary Film Festival on Human Rights where over 320 documentaries, with the topic of the drastic violations of human rights around the globe, were shown. It is held in "ABC" Cinema in Pristina. It began in 2000 and now it's in 12th edition. It is organised by Council for the Protection of the rights and Freedom (CDHRF), as a part of the Prague-based "World One" Festival. The Festival’s aim is to promote human rights, freedoms, and democracy, but also to feature meaningful debates on issues like human rights, civil society, foreign policy, environmental policy, etc. “One World” Festival remains a unique organization in Kosovo because of its topic.

References 

Lists of film festivals in Europe
Pristina
Culture in Pristina
Events in Pristina